Doris Kuhlmann-Wilsdorf (February 15, 1922 – March 25, 2010) was a German metallurgist.

Biography
Doris Kuhlmann-Wilsdorf was born in Bremen, Germany on February 15, 1922, to Adolph Friedrich and Elsa Kuhlmann. She attended the University of Göttingen from 1942 where she received her doctorate in materials science in 1947. Kuhlmann-Wilsdorf continued her research under Sir Nevill Francis Mott at the University of Bristol. She married Heinz Wilsdorf in 1950, with whom she travelled to University of the Witwatersrand to work as a lecturer in the same year. In 1956 they moved to the United States to work at the University of Virginia as professors in the Physics and Materials Science departments. She was named university professor of applied science in 1966; she was the first woman named as a full professor at the University of Virginia outside the schools of Medicine and Nursing. In 1994 Kuhlmann-Wilsdorf and her husband funded a professorship in their name and former students created a memorial building on the campus in their name in 2001.

Kuhlmann-Wilsdorf retired in 2005 and died after a short illness on March 25, 2010, in Charlottesville, Virginia. Her papers are held at the Albert and Shirley Small Special Collections Library at the University of Virginia.

Research
Kuhlmann-Wilsdorf published over 250 papers and has been a consultant to a number of corporations. Her research was primarily in metallurgy and materials science (with her expertise in tribology), known for her design of electrical metalfiber brushes used as sliding electrical contacts. She was a fellow of the American Physical Society and the American Society of Metals.

Honors and awards
Medal for Excellence in Research of the American Society of Engineering Education (1965 and 1966)
Heyn Medal of the German Society of Materials Science (1988)
Society of Women Engineers Achievement Award (1989)
Ragnar Holm Scientific Achievement Award of the Institute of Electrical and Electronics Engineers (1991)
Christopher J. Henderson Inventor of the Year (2001)
Fellow of TMS-AIME (2006)

References

American materials scientists
German materials scientists
Tribologists
1922 births
2010 deaths
German women physicists
American women physicists
German women scientists
University of Göttingen alumni
University of Virginia faculty
Fellows of the American Physical Society
20th-century American physicists
20th-century American women scientists
American women academics
German emigrants to the United States
Fellows of the Minerals, Metals & Materials Society
21st-century American women